Levy Sekgapane (born December 16, 1990) is a South-African operatic tenor.

The singer is a Bel canto tenor whose repertoire includes roles in works by G. Rossini, G. Donizetti, W. A. Mozart, J. S. Bach.

Sekgapane was named the 30 Under 30 Europe 2018: Arts & Culture by Forbes magazine.

Early life and education 
Levy Sekgapane was born on December 16, 1990, in Kroonstad South Africa. He graduated from the South African College of Music at the University of Cape Town.

Participation in international vocal competitions 
Levy Sekgapane obtained the 1st prize at the International Hans Gabor Belvedere Singing Competition as well as the 1st prize at the Montserrat Caballé International Singing Competition in 2015. In the summer of 2017, he won the 1st prize at Plácido Domingo's Operalia, the World Opera Competition.

Artistic activity 
The singer's stage activity began in Chemnitz (Germany) in 2014 when he sang the role of Don Ramiro in Rossini's La Cenerentola. During the season 2015/16 he became a member of the Young Ensemble of Semperoper in Dresden. 

The following season he performed the roles of Don Ramiro, Count Almaviva (Il barbiere di Siviglia) and Lindoro, at Teatro Massimo in Palermo, Bavarian State Opera, Hamburg State Opera and Aalto-Musiktheater Essen. He also appeared at Royal Opera Copenhagen, where he sang the role of Il Conte di Libenskof in a new production of Rossini's Il Viaggio a Reims (2017).

Levy Sekgapane also performed at opera festivals: the Rossini Opera Festival in Pesaro singing the roles of Albazar in Il Turco in Italia (2016) and Selimo in Adina (2018),  the Whitsun Festival at State Theatre Wiesbaden when he debuted as Nemorino in Donizetti's L’elisir d’amore (2018), the international Donizetti Opera festival in Bergamo singing the role of King Guido in Donizetti's Enrico di Borgogna (2018), Glyndebourne Festival as Count Almaviva, Salzburg Festival as Arbace in Mozart's Idomeneo (2019) and lastly in the Wexford Festival Opera in the role of Selimo (2019).

On the concert stage, he gave his debut at Elbphilharmonie Hamburg singing at New Year's Eve gala. He took part in a concert dedicated to Maria Callas which was hosted by Theatre Champs-Élysées in Paris. Sekgapane also performed in the AIDS Gala concert hosted annually at Deutsche Oper Berlin to support HIV and AIDS.

Repertoire

Opera roles

Concerts, recitals

References 

South African musicians
1990 births
Living people